The American alligator (Alligator mississippiensis), sometimes referred to colloquially as a gator or common alligator, is a large crocodilian reptile native to the Southeastern United States. It is one of the two extant species in the genus Alligator, and is larger than the only other living alligator species, the Chinese alligator.

The American alligator inhabits subtropical and tropical freshwater wetlands, such as marshes and cypress swamps, from southern Texas to North Carolina. It is distinguished from the sympatric American crocodile by its broader snout, with overlapping jaws and darker coloration, and is less tolerant of saltwater but more tolerant of cooler climates than the American crocodile, which is found only in tropical and warm subtropical climates.

American alligators are apex predators and consume fish, amphibians, reptiles, birds, and mammals. Hatchlings feed mostly on invertebrates. They play an important role as ecosystem engineers in wetland ecosystems through the creation of alligator holes, which provide both wet and dry habitats for other organisms. Throughout the year (in particular during the breeding season), American alligators bellow to declare territory, and locate suitable mates. Male American alligators use infrasound to attract females. Eggs are laid in a nest of vegetation, sticks, leaves, and mud in a sheltered spot in or near the water. Young are born with yellow bands around their bodies and are protected by their mother for up to one year.

The conservation status of the American alligator is listed as Least Concern by the International Union for Conservation of Nature. Historically, hunting had decimated their population, and the American alligator was listed as an endangered species by the Endangered Species Act of 1973. Subsequent conservation efforts have allowed their numbers to increase and the species was removed from endangered status in 1987. The species is the official state reptile of three states: Florida, Louisiana, and Mississippi.

Taxonomy 

The American alligator was first classified by French zoologist François Marie Daudin as Crocodilus mississipiensis in 1801. In 1807, Georges Cuvier created the genus Alligator; the American alligator and the Chinese alligator are the only extant species in the genus. They are grouped in the family Alligatoridae with the caimans. The superfamily Alligatoroidea includes all crocodilians (fossil and extant) that are more closely related to the American alligator than to either the Nile crocodile (Crocodylus niloticus) or the gharial (Gavialis gangeticus).

Phylogeny
Members of this superfamily first arose in the late Cretaceous, about 100–65 million years ago (Mya). Leidyosuchus of Alberta is the earliest known fossil, from the Campanian era 83 to 72 Mya.  Fossil alligatoroids have been found throughout Eurasia, because bridges across both the North Atlantic and the Bering Strait connected North America to Eurasia about 66 to 23 Mya.

Alligators and caimans split in North America during the late Cretaceous, and the caimans reached South America by the Paleogene, before the closure of the Isthmus of Panama during the Neogene period, from about 23 to 2.58 Mya. The Chinese alligator likely descended from a lineage that crossed the Bering land bridge during the Neogene. Fossils identical to the existing American alligator are found throughout the Pleistocene, from 2.5 million to 11.7 thousand years ago. In 2016, a Miocene (about 23 to 5.3 Mya) fossil skull of an alligator was found at Marion County, Florida. Unlike the other extinct alligator species of the same genus, the fossil skull was virtually indistinguishable from that of the modern American alligator. This alligator and the American alligator are now considered to be sister taxa, meaning that the A. mississippiensis lineage has existed in North America for over 8 million years.

The alligator's full mitochondrial genome was sequenced in the 1990s, and it suggests the animal evolved at a rate similar to mammals and greater than birds and most cold-blooded vertebrates. However, the full genome, published in 2014, suggests that the alligator evolved much more slowly than mammals and birds.

Characteristics

Domestic American alligators range from long and slender to short and robust, possibly in response to variations in factors such as growth rate, diet, and climate.

Size
The American alligator is a relatively large species of crocodilian. On average, it is the largest species in the family Alligatoridae, with only the black caiman being possibly larger. Weight varies considerably depending on length, age, health, season, and available food sources. Similar to many other reptiles that range expansively into temperate zones, American alligators from the northern end of their range, such as southern Arkansas, Alabama, and northern North Carolina, tend to reach smaller sizes.

On rare occasions, a large, old male may grow to an even greater length.

Largest
During the 19th and 20th centuries, larger males reaching  were reported.

Reported sizes

Average
American alligators do not normally reach such extreme sizes. In Lake Griffin State Park, Florida, adults weighed on average .

Relation to age
There is a common belief stated throughout reptilian literature that crocodilians, including the American alligator, exhibit indeterminate growth, meaning the animal continues to grow for the duration of its life. However, these claims are largely based on assumptions and observations of juvenile and young adult crocodilians, and recent studies are beginning to contradict this claim. For example, one long-term mark-recapture study (1979-2015) done at the Tom Yawkey Wildlife Center in South Carolina found evidence to support patterns of determinate growth, with growth ceasing upon reaching a certain age (43 years for males and 31 years for females).

Sexual dimorphism
While noticeable in very mature specimens, the sexual dimorphism in size of the American alligator is relatively modest among crocodilians. For contrast, the sexual dimorphism of saltwater crocodiles is much more extreme, with mature males nearly twice as long as and at least four times as heavy as female saltwater crocodiles.

Color
Dorsally, adult American alligators may be olive, brown, gray, or black. However, they are on average one of the most darkly colored modern crocodilians (although other alligatorid family members are also fairly dark), and can be reliably be distinguished by color via their more blackish dorsal scales against crocodiles. Meanwhile, their undersides are cream-colored. Some American alligators are missing or have an inhibited gene for melanin, which makes them albino. These American alligators are extremely rare and almost impossible to find in the wild. They could only survive in captivity, as they are very vulnerable to the sun and predators.

Jaws, teeth, and snout

American alligators have 74-80 teeth. As they grow and develop, the morphology of their teeth and jaws change significantly. Juveniles have small, needle-like teeth that become much more robust and narrow snouts that become broader as the individuals develop. These morphological changes correspond to shifts in the American alligators' diets, from smaller prey items such as fish and insects to larger prey items such as turtles, birds, and other large vertebrates. American alligators have broad snouts, especially in captive individuals. When the jaws are closed, the edges of the upper jaws cover the lower teeth, which fit into the jaws' hollows. Like the spectacled caiman, this species has a bony nasal ridge, though it is less prominent. American alligators are often mistaken for a similar animal: the American crocodile. An easy characteristic to distinguish the two is the fourth tooth. Whenever an American alligator's mouth is closed, the fourth tooth is no longer visible. It is enclosed in a pocket in the upper jaw.

Bite
No significant difference is noted between the bite forces of male and female American alligators of equal size. Another study noted that as the American alligator increases in size, the force of its bite also increases.

Movement

When on land, an American alligator moves either by sprawling or walking, the latter involving the reptile lifting its belly off the ground. The sprawling of American alligators and other crocodylians is not similar to that of salamanders and lizards, being similar to walking. Therefore, the two forms of land locomotion can be termed the "low walk" and the "high walk". Unlike most other land vertebrates, American alligators increase their speed through the distal rather than proximal ends of their limbs. In the water, American alligators swim like fish, moving their pelvic regions and tails from side to side. During respiration, air flow is unidirectional, looping through the lungs during inhalation and exhalation; the American alligator's abdominal muscles can alter the position of the lungs within the torso, thus shifting the center of buoyancy, which allows the American alligator to dive, rise, and roll within the water.

Distribution 

American alligators, being native both to the Nearctic and Neotropical realms, are found in the wild in the Southeastern United States, from the Lowcountry in South Carolina, south to Everglades National Park in Florida, and west to the southeastern region of Texas. They are found in parts of North Carolina, South Carolina, Georgia, Florida, Louisiana, Alabama, Mississippi, Arkansas, Oklahoma and Texas. Some of these locations appear to be relatively recent introductions, with often small but reproductive populations. Louisiana has the largest American alligator population of any U.S. state. In the future, possible American alligator populations may be found in areas of Mexico adjacent to the Texas border. Alligators have been naturally expanding their range into Tennessee, and have established a small population in the southwestern part of that state via inland waterways, according to the state's wildlife agency.

Conservation status 

American alligators are currently listed as least concern by the IUCN Red List, even though from the 1800s to the mid-1900s, they were being hunted and poached by humans unsustainably. In 1987, the U.S. Fish and Wildlife Service pronounced the American alligator fully recovered.

Historically, hunting and habitat loss have severely affected American alligator populations throughout their range, and whether the species would survive was in doubt. In 1967, the American alligator was listed as an endangered species (under a law that was the precursor Endangered Species Act of 1973), since it was believed to be in danger of extinction throughout all or a significant portion of its range.

Both the United States Fish and Wildlife Service (USFWS) and state wildlife agencies in the South contributed to the American alligator's recovery. Protection under the Endangered Species Act allowed the species to recuperate in many areas where it had been depleted. States began monitoring their American alligator populations to ensure that they would continue to grow. In 1987, the USFWS removed the animal from the endangered species list, as it was considered to be fully recovered. The USFWS still regulates the legal trade in American alligators and their products to protect still endangered crocodilians that may be passed off as American alligators during trafficking.

American alligators are listed under Appendix II of the Convention on International Trade in Endangered Species (CITES) meaning that international trade in the species (including parts and derivatives) is regulated.

Habitat
They inhabit swamps, streams, rivers, ponds, and lakes.  A lone American alligator was spotted for over 10 years living in a river north of Atlanta, Georgia. Females and juveniles are also found in Carolina Bays and other seasonal wetlands. While they prefer fresh water, American alligators may sometimes wander into brackish water, but are less tolerant of salt water than American crocodiles, as the salt glands on their tongues do not function. One study of American alligators in north-central Florida found the males preferred open lake water during the spring, while females used both swampy and open-water areas. During summer, males still preferred open water, while females remained in the swamps to construct their nests and lay their eggs. Both sexes may den underneath banks or clumps of trees during the winter.

In some areas of their range, American alligators are an unusual example of urban wildlife; golf courses are often favoured by the species due to an abundance of water and a frequent supply of prey animals such as fish and birds.

Cold tolerance
American alligators are less vulnerable to cold than American crocodiles. This adaptiveness is thought to be why American alligators are widespread further north than the American crocodile. In fact, the American alligator is found farther from the equator and is more equipped to handle cooler conditions than any other crocodilian. When the water begins to freeze, American alligators go into a period of brumation; they stick their snouts through the surface, which allows them to breathe above the ice, and they can remain in this state for several days.

Ecology and behavior

Basking

American alligators primarily bask on shore, but also climb into and perch on tree limbs to bask if no shoreline is available. This is not often seen, since if disturbed, they quickly retreat back into the water by jumping from their perch.

Holes
American alligators modify wetland habitats, most dramatically in flat areas such as the Everglades, by constructing small ponds known as alligator holes. This behavior has qualified the American alligator to be considered a keystone species. Alligator holes retain water during the dry season and provide a refuge for aquatic organisms, which survive the dry season by seeking refuge in alligator holes, so are a source of future populations. The construction of nests along the periphery of alligator holes, as well as a buildup of soils during the excavation process, provides drier areas for other reptiles to nest and a place for plants that are intolerant of inundation to colonize. Alligator holes are an oasis during the Everglades dry season, so are consequently important foraging sites for other organisms. In the limestone depressions of cypress swamps, alligator holes tend to be large and deep, while those in marl prairies and rocky glades are usually small and shallow, and those in peat depressions of ridge and slough wetlands are more variable.

Prey

Bite and mastication
The teeth of the American alligator are designed to grip prey, but cannot rip or chew flesh like teeth of some other predators (such as canids and felids), and depend on their gizzard, instead, to masticate their food. The American alligator is capable of biting through a turtle's shell or a moderately sized mammal bone.

Tool use
American alligators have been documented using lures to hunt prey such as birds. This means they are among the first reptiles recorded to use tools. By balancing sticks and branches on their heads, American alligators are able to lure birds looking for suitable nesting material to kill and consume. This strategy, which is shared by the mugger crocodile, is particularly effective during the nesting season, in which birds are more likely to gather appropriate nesting materials.

Aquatic vs terrestrial

Fish and other aquatic prey taken in the water or at the water's edge form the major part of American alligator's diet and may be eaten at any time of the day or night. Usually, terrestrial hunting occurs on nights with warm temperatures. When hunting terrestrial prey, American alligators may also ambush them from the edge of the water by grabbing them and pulling the prey into the water, the preferred method of predation of larger crocodiles.

Additionally, American alligators have recently been filmed and documented killing and eating sharks and rays; four incidents documented indicated that bonnetheads, lemon sharks, Atlantic stingrays, and nurse sharks are components of the animal's diet. Sharks are also known to prey on American alligators, in turn, indicating that encounters between the two predators are common.

Common
American alligators are considered an apex predator throughout their range. They are opportunists and their diet is determined largely by both their size and age and the size and availability of prey. Most American alligators eat a wide variety of animals, including invertebrates, fish, birds, turtles, snakes, amphibians, and mammals. Hatchlings mostly feed on invertebrates such as insects, insect larvae, snails, spiders, and worms, as well as small fish and frogs. As they grow, American alligators gradually expand to larger prey. Once an American alligator reaches full size and power in adulthood, any animal living in the water or coming to the water to drink is potential prey. Most animals captured by American alligators are considerably smaller than itself. A few examples of animals consumed are largemouth bass, spotted gar, freshwater pearl mussels, American green tree frogs, yellow mud turtles, cottonmouths, common moorhens, and feral wild boars. Stomach contents show, among native mammals, muskrats and raccoons are some of the most commonly eaten species. In Louisiana, where introduced coypu are common, they are perhaps the most regular prey for adult American alligators, although only larger adults commonly eat this species. It has also been reported that large American alligators prey on medium-sized American alligators, which had preyed on hatchlings and smaller juveniles. 

If an American alligator's primary food resource is not available, it will sometimes feed on carrion and non-prey items such as rocks and artificial objects, like bottle caps. These items help the American alligator in the process of digestion by crushing up the meat and bones of animals, especially animals with shells.

Large animals
Other animals may occasionally be eaten, even large deer or feral wild boars, but these are not normally part of the diet. American alligators occasionally prey on large mammals, such as deer, but usually do so when fish and smaller prey levels go down. Rarely, American alligators have been observed killing and eating bobcats, but such events are not common and have little effect on bobcat populations. Although American alligators have been listed as predators of the Nilgai and the West Indian manatees, very little evidence exists of such predation. In the 2000s, when invasive Burmese pythons first occupied the Everglades, American alligators have been recorded preying on sizable snakes, possibly controlling populations and preventing the invasive species from spreading northwards. However, the python is also known to occasionally prey on alligators, a form of both competition and predation.
American alligator predation on Florida panthers is rare, but has been documented. Such incidents usually involve a panther trying to cross a waterway or coming down to a swamp or river to get a drink. American alligator predation on American black bears has also been recorded.

Domestic animals
Occasionally, domestic animals, including dogs, cats, and calves, are taken as available, but are secondary to wild and feral prey. Other prey, including snakes, lizards, and various invertebrates, are eaten occasionally by adults.

Birds
Water birds, such as herons and egrets, storks, waterfowl and large dabbling rails such as gallinules or coots, are taken when possible. Occasionally, unwary adult birds are grabbed and eaten by American alligators, but most predation on bird species occurs with unsteady fledgling birds in late summer, as fledgling birds attempt to make their first flights near the water's edge.

Fruit
In 2013, American alligators and other crocodilians were reported to also eat fruit.
Such behavior has been witnessed, as well as documented from stomach contents, with the American alligators eating such fruit as wild grapes, elderberries, and citrus fruits directly from the trees. The discovery of this unexpected part of the American alligator diet further reveals that they may be responsible for spreading seeds from the fruit they consume across their habitat. Additionally, American alligators engage in what seems to be cooperative hunting.

In Florida and East Texas
The diet of adult American alligators from central Florida lakes is dominated by fish, but the species is highly opportunistically based upon local availability. In Lake Griffin, fish made up 54% of the diet by weight, with catfish being most commonly consumed, while in Lake Apopka, fish made up 90% of the food and mostly shad were taken; in Lake Woodruff, the diet was 84% fish and largely consists of bass and sunfish. Unusually in these regions, reptiles and amphibians were the most important nonpiscivore prey, mostly turtles and water snakes. In southern Louisiana, crustaceans (largely crawfish and crabs) were found to be present in the southeastern American alligators, but largely absent in southwestern American alligators, which consumed a relatively high proportion of reptiles, although fish were the most recorded prey for adults, and adult males consumed a large portion of mammals.

In East Texas, diets were diverse and adult American alligators took mammals, reptiles, amphibians, and invertebrates (e.g. snails) in often equal measure as they did fish.

Vocalizations

Mechanism
An American alligator is able to abduct and adduct the vocal folds of its larynx, but not to elongate or shorten them; yet in spite of this, it can modulate fundamental frequency very well. Their vocal folds consists of epithelium, lamina propria and muscle. Sounds ranged from 50 to 1200 Hz. In one experiment conducted on the larynx, the fundamental frequency depended on both the glottal gap and stiffness of the larynx tissues. As the frequency increases, there's high tension and large strains. The fundamental frequency has been influenced by the glottal gap size and subglottal pressure and when the phonation threshold pressure has been exceeded, there will be vocal fold vibration.

Calls
Crocodilians are the most vocal of all non-avian reptiles and have a variety of different calls depending on the age, size, and sex of the animal. The American alligator can perform specific vocalizations to declare territory, signal distress, threaten competitors, and locate suitable mates. Juveniles can perform a high-pitched hatchling call (a "yelping" trait common to many crocodilian species' hatchling young) to alert their mothers when they are ready to emerge from the nest. Juveniles also make a distress call to alert their mothers if they are being threatened. Adult American alligators can growl, hiss, or cough to threaten others and declare territory.

Bellowing
Both males and females bellow loudly by sucking air into their lungs and blowing it out in intermittent, deep-toned roars to attract mates and declare territory. Males are known to use infrasound during mating bellows. Bellowing is performed in a "head oblique, tail arched" posture. Infrasonic waves from a bellowing male can cause the surface of the water directly over and to either side of his back to literally "sprinkle", in what is commonly called the "water dance". Large bellowing "choruses" of American alligators during the breeding season are commonly initiated by females and perpetuated by males. Observers of large bellowing choruses have noted they are often felt more than they are heard due to the intense infrasound emitted by males. American alligators bellow in B flat (specifically "B♭1", defined as an audio frequency of 58.27 Hz), and bellowing choruses can be induced by tuba players, sonic booms, and large aircraft.

Lifespan
American alligators typically live to the age of 50, and possibly over 70 years old. Males reach sexual maturity at around 11.6 years, and females at around 15.8 years. Although it was originally thought that alligators never stop growing, studies have now found that males stop growing at around the age of 43 years, and females stop growing at around the age of 31 years.

Reproduction

Breeding season
The breeding season begins in the spring. On spring nights, American alligators gather in large numbers for group courtship, in the aforementioned "water dances". The female builds a nest of vegetation, sticks, leaves, and mud in a sheltered spot in or near the water.

Eggs
After the female lays her 20 to 50 white eggs, about the size of a goose egg, she covers them with more vegetation, which heats as it decays, helping to keep the eggs warm. This differs from Nile crocodiles, which lay their eggs in pits. The temperature at which American alligator eggs develop determines their sex (see temperature-dependent sex determination). Studies have found that eggs hatched at a temperature below 88.7 °F or a temperature above 94.1 °F will produce female offspring, while those at a temperature between 90.5 °F to 92.3 °F will produce male offspring. The nests built on levees are warmer, thus produce males, while the cooler nests of wet marsh produce females. The female remains near the nest throughout the 65-day incubation period, protecting it from intruders. When the young begin to hatch — their "yelping" calls can sometimes even be heard just before hatching commences — the mother quickly digs them out and carries them to the water in her mouth, as some other crocodilian species are known to do.

Young
The young are tiny replicas of adults, with a series of yellow bands around their bodies that serve as camouflage. Hatchlings gather into pods and are guarded by their mother and keep in contact with her through their "yelping" vocalizations. Young American alligators eat small fish, frogs, crayfish, and insects. They are preyed on by large fish, birds, raccoons, Florida panthers, and adult American alligators. Mother American alligators eventually become more aggressive towards their young, which encourages them to disperse.

Interactions with exotic species
Nutria were introduced into coastal marshes from South America in the mid-20th century, and their population has since exploded into the millions. They cause serious damage to coastal marshes and may dig burrows in levees. Hence, Louisiana has had a bounty to try to reduce nutria numbers. Large American alligators feed heavily on nutria, so American alligators may not only control nutria populations in Louisiana, but also prevent them spreading east into the Everglades. Since hunting and trapping preferentially take the large American alligators that are the most important in eating nutria, some changes in harvesting may be needed to capitalize on their ability to control nutria.

Recently, a population of Burmese pythons became established in Everglades National Park. Substantial American alligator populations in the Everglades might be a contributing factor, as a competitor, in keeping the python populations low, preventing the spread of the species north. While events of predation by Burmese pythons on any sizable American alligators have been observed, no evidence of a net negative effect has been seen on overall American alligator populations.

Indicators of environmental restoration

American alligators play an important role in the restoration of the Everglades as biological indicators of restoration success. American alligators are highly sensitive to changes in the hydrology, salinity, and productivity of their ecosystems; all are factors that are expected to change with Everglades restoration. American alligators also may control the long-term vegetation dynamics in wetlands by reducing the population of small mammals, particularly coypu, which may otherwise overgraze marsh vegetation.  In this way, the vital ecological service they provide may be important in reducing rates of coastal wetland losses in Louisiana. They may provide a protection service for water birds nesting on islands in freshwater wetlands. American alligators prevent predatory mammals from reaching island-based rookeries and in return eat spilled food and birds that fall from their nests. Wading birds appear to be attracted to areas with American alligators and have been known to nest at heavily trafficked tourist attractions with large numbers of American alligators, such as the St. Augustine Alligator Farm in St. Augustine, Florida.

Relationship with humans

Attacks on humans

American alligators are capable of killing humans, but fatal attacks are fairly rare. Mistaken identity leading to an attack is always possible, especially in or near cloudy waters. American alligators are often less aggressive towards humans than larger crocodile species, a few of which (mainly the Nile and saltwater crocodiles) may prey on humans with some regularity. Alligator bites are serious injuries, due to the reptile's sheer bite force and risk of infection. Even with medical treatment, an American alligator bite may still result in a fatal infection.

As human populations increase, and as they build houses in low-lying areas, or fish or hunt near water, incidents are inevitable where humans intrude on American alligators and their habitats. Since 1948, 257 documented attacks on humans in Florida (about five incidents per year) have been reported, of which an estimated 23 resulted in death. Only nine fatal attacks occurred in the United States throughout the 1970s–1990s, but American alligators killed 12 people between 2001 and 2007. An additional report of alligator attacks showed a total of 376 injuries and 15 deaths recorded all from 1948 to 2004, leading this to an increase of the alligator population. In May 2006, American alligators killed three Floridians in less than a week. At least 28 fatal attacks by American alligators have occurred in the United States since 1970.

Wrestling 

Since the late 1880s, alligator wrestling has been a source of entertainment for some. Created by the Miccosukee and Seminole tribes prior to the arrival of Europeans, this tourism tradition remains popular despite criticism from animal-rights activists.

Farming 

Today, alligator farming is a large, growing industry in Georgia, Florida, Texas, and Louisiana. These states produce a combined annual total of some 45,000 alligator hides. Alligator hides bring good prices and hides in the 6- to 7-ft range have sold for $300 each. According to the Florida Department of Agriculture and Consumer Services, raw alligator meat contains roughly 200 Calories (840 kJ) per 3-oz (85-g) portion, of which 27 Calories (130 kJ) come from fat.

Culture and film
The American alligator is the official state reptile of Florida, Louisiana, and Mississippi. Several organizations and products from Florida have been named after the animal.

"Gators" has been the nickname of the University of Florida's sports teams since 1911. In 1908, a printer made a spur-of-the-moment decision to print an alligator emblem on a shipment of the school's football pennants. The mascot stuck, and was made official in 1911, perhaps because the team captain's nickname was Gator. Allegheny College and San Francisco State University both have Gators as their mascots, as well.

The Gator Bowl is a college football game held in Jacksonville annually since 1946, with Gator Bowl Stadium hosting the event until the 1993 edition. The Gatornationals is a NHRA drag race held at the Gainesville Raceway in Gainesville since 1970.

See also
 Chinese alligator, the other living species of alligator
 Muja, the oldest living alligator in captivity, lived in Belgrade Zoo, Serbia
 Saturn, an alligator that survived the destruction of the Berlin Zoological Garden during World War II
 The Alligator People
 Gatorland
 Brazos Bend State Park
 Sewer alligator

References

External links

 Crocodilian Online
 Photo exhibit on alligators in Florida from State Archives of Florida
 Why the Gulf Coast needs more big alligators
 Alligator bellows and hisses  – sound clips from the U.S. Fish and Wildlife Service

Further reading
 Boulenger GA (1889). Catalogue of the Chelonians, Rhynchocephalians, and Crocodiles in the British Museum (Natural History). New Edition. London: Trustees of the British Museum (Natural History). (Taylor and Francis, printers). x + 311 pp. + Plates I-VI. (Alligator mississippiensis, p. 290).
 Daudin FM (1802). Histoire Naturelle, Générale et Particulière des Reptiles; Ouvrage faisant suite à l'Histoire Naturelle générale et particulière, composée par Leclerc de Buffon; et rédigée par C.S. Sonnini, membre de plusieurs sociétés savantes. Tome Second [Volume 2]. 432 pp. Paris: F. Dufart. ("Crocodilus mississipiensis [sic]", new species, pp. 412–416). (in French and Latin).
 Powell R, Conant R, Collins JT (2016). Peterson Field Guide to Reptiles and Amphibians of Eastern and Central North America, Fourth Edition. Boston and New York: Houghton Mifflin Harcourt. xiv + 494 pp., 47 Plates, 207 Figures. . (Alligator mississippiensis, p. 170 + Plate 13 + photographs on pp. 166–167, 465).
 Smith, Hobart M.; Brodie, Edmund D., Jr. (1982). Reptiles of North America: A Guide to Field Identification. New York: Golden Press. 240 pp. . (Alligator mississippiensis, pp. 208–209).

Alligatoridae
Apex predators
Articles containing video clips
Crocodilians of North America
Cuisine of the Southern United States
Extant Miocene first appearances
Fauna of the Southeastern United States
Miocene reptiles of North America
Native American cuisine of the Southeastern Woodlands
Quaternary reptiles of North America
Reptiles described in 1802
Reptiles of Mexico
Reptiles of the United States
Symbols of Florida
Symbols of Louisiana
Symbols of Mississippi
Tool-using animals
Taxobox binomials not recognized by IUCN